Cengiz Özek (born June 4, 1964) is Turkish traditional shadow theatre manipulator of Karagöz. He established Istanbul's first annual international puppet festival, Istanbul International Puppet Festival, in 1998, and has organized it every May since then.

Footnotes

1964 births
Living people
Turkish theatre directors